The Cruel Sea is a 1951 novel by Nicholas Monsarrat. It follows the lives of a group of Royal Navy sailors fighting the Battle of the Atlantic during the Second World War. It contains seven chapters, each describing a year during the war.

The novel, based on the author's experience of serving in corvettes and frigates in the North Atlantic in the Second World War, gives a matter-of-fact but moving portrayal of ordinary men learning to fight and survive in a violent, exhausting battle against the elements and a ruthless enemy.

Plot summary
The action commences in 1939. Lieutenant-Commander George Ericson, a Merchant Navy and Royal Naval Reserve officer, is recalled to the Royal Navy and given command of the fictitious  HMS Compass Rose, newly built to escort convoys. His officers are mostly new to the Navy, especially the two new sub-lieutenants, Lockhart and Ferraby. Only Ericson and the petty officers are in any way experienced.

Despite these initial disadvantages, the ship and crew work up a routine and gain experience. Bennett, the first lieutenant, a mean and shirking disciplinarian with a penchant for bullying and canned sausages ("snorkers"), leaves the ship ostensibly for health reasons, and the junior officers are able to mature, with Lockhart gaining promotion to first lieutenant.

The crew cross the Atlantic many times on escort duty in all kinds of weather, often encountering fierce storms in one of the smallest ships built to protect Allied convoys. The men endure the ship's constant rolling and pitching in the huge waves, freezing cold, the strain of maintaining station on the convoy on pitch-black nights and the fear that at any second a torpedo from a German U-boat could blow them to oblivion. Somehow the tradition of the Royal Navy and the knowledge of the importance of their work carries them through.

They continue the monotonous and dangerous but vital duty of convoy escort, and after one particularly difficult convoy they use all their hard-won knowledge to sink a German submarine. They are nearly sunk several times until in 1943 they are finally torpedoed and forced to abandon ship. Most of the crew die in the freezing waters, but Ericson, Lockhart, Ferraby, and a few others are rescued the next day; however Ferraby suffers a breakdown forcing him to go to hospital.

Ericson, now promoted to commander, and Lockhart, now a lieutenant-commander, take command of a new ship, the fictitious  HMS Saltash.

The Royal Navy is now finally gaining the upper hand over the U-boats and Saltash adds to the growing number of kills due to Ericson's determination and patience.

In chapter seven the ship receives a message ordering it to "remain on patrol in vicinity of Rockall" as the end of the Second World War approaches in 1945, and as finally hostilities were declared ended, a well-known quote: 

With the war ended, Saltash returns to port as a guard to several German submarines that have surrendered.
 
A secondary plotline concerns Lockhart's poignant romance with a beautiful Women's Royal Naval Service officer.

Origins and authenticity

Nicholas Monsarrat's own career was the model for that of his character Lockhart, a Fleet Street reporter in the 1930s, commissioned as a naval reservist.  Monsarrat spent the war in anti-submarine escort ships, rising to the rank of lieutenant-commander.  His first book, Three Corvettes, was published in 1945.  After the war, he was a publicity officer at British missions overseas (notably Ottawa) before becoming a full-time writer.

Over half a century later, the historian Paul Kennedy still considered Monsarrat's fictionalisation of his experiences as the best and most authentic guide to the mentality of the wartime escort commander.

Film and radio adaptations
The novel was made into the film The Cruel Sea in 1953, directed by Charles Frend and starring Jack Hawkins as Commander Ericson and Donald Sinden as Lockhart.

BBC Light Programme produced a radio dramatisation written by Stephen Grenfell and starred Jack Hawkins which was broadcast on 23 February 1955. 

BBC Radio 4 has produced two radio adaptations of the book. In September 1980, a two-hour dramatised version starred Richard Pasco as Ericson and Michael N. Harbour as Lockhart, and with Terry Molloy as the coxswain of Saltash. The narrator was Martin Muncaster. In March 2012, another two-hour version, starred Gwilym Lee as Lockhart and Jonathan Coy as Ericson. Dramatised by John Fletcher and directed by Marc Beeby, this adaptation went on to win 'Best Use of Sound in an Audio Drama' in the BBC Audio Drama Awards 2013.

In 1998 BBC Radio 2 released a three-hour full-cast dramatisation audiobook as part of the BBC Radio Collection. The novel was adapted by Joe Dunlop. The cast included Donald Sinden (Narrator), Philip Madoc (Ericson), Paul Rhys (Lockhart), Michael Maloney (Ferraby), Helen Baxendale (Julie Hallam), Emma Cunniffe and Jack Davenport. The novel is also available as an audiobook.

References

External links 
 The Monsarrat Archive, BBC Radio 4
 The Cruel Sea, 3 & 10 March 2012, BBC Radio 4

1951 British novels
Novels set during World War II
British novels adapted into films
Novels about submarine warfare
Battle of the Atlantic
Cassell (publisher) books
Alfred A. Knopf books
Novels set on ships
Novels by Nicholas Monsarrat